Laura Aleida Sánchez Soto (born October 16, 1985, in Guadalajara) is a Mexican female diver. She has represented her native country at three consecutive Summer Olympics, starting in 2004 (Athens, Greece).
Sánchez scored her first Olympic medal on August 5, 2012, in London when she won the bronze in 3 meter springboard diving.

Sánchez also won two gold medals at the Pan American Games in 2011, one gold and one silver in 2007, and two silver in 2003.

References

1985 births
Living people
Mexican female divers
Olympic divers of Mexico
Olympic bronze medalists for Mexico
Olympic medalists in diving
Divers at the 2004 Summer Olympics
Divers at the 2008 Summer Olympics
Divers at the 2012 Summer Olympics
Medalists at the 2012 Summer Olympics
Pan American Games gold medalists for Mexico
Pan American Games silver medalists for Mexico
Pan American Games medalists in diving
Divers at the 2003 Pan American Games
Divers at the 2007 Pan American Games
Divers at the 2011 Pan American Games
Central American and Caribbean Games gold medalists for Mexico
Universiade medalists in diving
World Aquatics Championships medalists in diving
Sportspeople from Guadalajara, Jalisco
Competitors at the 2006 Central American and Caribbean Games
Universiade gold medalists for Mexico
Central American and Caribbean Games medalists in diving
Medalists at the 2009 Summer Universiade
Medalists at the 2011 Pan American Games
20th-century Mexican women
21st-century Mexican women